Bedrich Posselt was a Czechoslovakian bobsledder who competed in the mid-1930s. He finished 12th in the four-man event at the 1936 Winter Olympics in Garmisch-Partenkirchen.

References
1936 bobsleigh four-man results
1936 Olympic Winter Games official report - p. 415.
Bedrich Posselt's profile at Sports Reference.com

Olympic bobsledders of Czechoslovakia
Bobsledders at the 1936 Winter Olympics
Czechoslovak male bobsledders
Year of death missing
Year of birth missing